Altamonte Springs is a suburban city in central Florida in Seminole County, Florida, United States, which had a population of 46,231 at the 2020 United States Census. The city is in the northern suburbs of the Orlando–Kissimmee–Sanford Metropolitan Statistical Area, which the United States Census Bureau estimated had a population of 2,054,574 in 2008.

Dr. Washington Kilmer of Cincinnati was the first person of European background to settle into the area circa 1870, and he named the area Altamont (minus the "e" from the present spelling) after Altamont, New York, an area near his childhood home. In 1882, the Altamonte Land, Hotel and Navigation Company, founded by Thomas C. Simpson and four other Massachusetts businessmen, gave the area its present name: Altamonte Springs. The company developed the core community along Altamonte Avenue (today's SR 436) between Maitland and Longwood Avenues (today's Ronald Reagan Boulevard). On November 11, 1920, the residents of Altamonte Springs voted 38 to 7 in favor of incorporation.

Geography
Altamonte Springs is located at  (28.661463, –81.392016).

According to the United States Census Bureau, the city has a total area of 9.4 mi2 (24.5 km2), of which 8.9 mi2 (23.1 km2) is land and 0.6 mi2 (1.5 km2) (5.93%) is water.

Government
Altamonte Springs has a city manager, city commissioner form of government, consisting of four commission districts and the mayor serving citywide.

Demographics

As of the census of 2000, there were 41,200 people, 18,821 households, and 10,012 families residing in the city. The population density was 4,631.1 inhabitants per square mile (1,787.3/km2). The racial makeup of the city was 79.23% White, 9.72% African American, 0.33% Native American, 2.94% Asian, 0.04% Pacific Islander, 4.79% from other races, and 2.94% from two or more races. Hispanic or Latino of any race were 15.93% of the population.

There were 18,821 households, out of which 24.8% had children under the age of 18 living with them, 37.1% were married couples living together, 12.0% had a female householder with no husband present, and 46.8% were non-families. 36.1% of all households were made up of individuals, and 6.7% had someone living alone who was 65 years of age or older. The average household size was 2.17 and the average family size was 2.86.

In the city, the population was spread out, with 20.4% under the age of 18, 10.8% from 18 to 24, 37.1% from 25 to 44, 21.0% from 45 to 64, and 10.7% who were 65 years of age or older. The median age was 34 years. For every 100 females, there were 92.6 males. For every 100 females age 18 and over, there were 89.6 males.

The median income for a household in the city was $41,578, and the median income for a family was $49,082. Males had a median income of $34,413 versus $28,897 for females. The per capita income for the city was $23,216. About 5.6% of families and 7.4% of the population were below the poverty line, including 9.5% of those under age 18 and 6.4% of those age 65 or over.

Education
The city of Altamonte Springs' public schools are a part of Seminole County Public Schools. Altamonte Springs is served by 5 public elementary schools (K–5); 2 public middle school (6–8); and 2 public high school (9–12). The city of Altamonte Springs is also home to a branch of Seminole State College of Florida. Additionally, Altamonte Springs boasts 10 percent more college graduates per capita than the Florida average, and is just a few miles away from the University of Central Florida and Rollins College.

Elementary
 Forest City Elementary
 Altamonte Elementary
 Lake Orienta Elementary
 Spring Lake Elementary

Middle
 Teague Middle
 Milwee Middle

High
 Lake Brantley High School
 Lyman High School
 South Seminole High School

Private
 Forest Lake Academy
 Forest Lake Education Center
 Altamonte Christian School
 Saint Mary Magdalen School
 Pace Brantley Hall School
 Annunciation Catholic Academy

College
 Seminole State College of Florida
 Everglades University

Library
Serving the needs of residents since 1960, the Altamonte Springs City Library houses a permanent collection of 44,000 items.

Cranes Roost Park and Uptown Altamonte

Cranes Roost Park, Cranes Roost Lake, and the general area on State Road 436 east of Interstate 4 is known as the central area of the city. This is the area that borders Interstate 4 which is the main interstate highway for Central Florida connecting Daytona Beach, Orlando, and Tampa. An outdoor town center was recently opened named 'Uptown Altamonte' which marks the central business district of the city. Cranes Roost at Uptown Altamonte features a water fountain choreographed to classical, swing and contemporary music.

This city center incorporates large-scale apartment buildings and planned high rise condominiums. The construction also includes mixed use shops and retailers. The park area includes a square for weddings, festivals, and city holidays. The spot has become popular with Altamonte Springs residents, and attracts residents from nearby Longwood, Casselberry, and Maitland. Future plans include two high rise residential structures (in excess of 10 stories) and a series of parking structures to facilitate visitors.

The area includes the Altamonte Mall, a 4-anchor indoor shopping mall, which includes an 18-screen AMC Theatre. Many restaurants are located near the mall such as several Darden Restaurants, Denny's, Five Guys, Little Greek Fresh Grill and Jason's Deli.

Special events
Since 1995 Altamonte Springs has been host city to the Red, Hot, & Boom annual firework festival each July 3 in celebration of Independence Day. The event, which includes musical performances by nationally and internationally known entertainers and a custom fireworks show with over 15,000 shells, has drawn 200,000 people in recent years, and is Central Florida's largest Independence Day Celebration.

Parks and recreation

Parks and events

 A Petrified Forest (Halloween Event)
 Bird Watchers Wanted
 Cranes Roost
 Earth Day Event
 Hermits Trail & Turnbull Ave
 Jr. Rangers Program
 Lake Lotus Nature Park
 Lake Orienta Public Boat Ramp
 Red, Hot, and Boom (Fourth of July Event)
 Sunshine Park

Recreation areas
 Eastmonte
 Lake Brantley Sports Complex
 Merrill Park
 Westmonte
 Winwood Park

Transportation

Airports
Altamonte Springs is served primarily by Orlando International Airport, which is located 30 minutes south. Orlando Sanford International Airport, located 25 minutes north, also serves the area. Orlando Executive Airport, located 20 minutes south, is used for charter flights and general aviation.

Bus service
Altamonte Springs is served by Lynx, offering local transit service which covers the three-county area (Osceola-Orange-Seminole).

Rail
Altamonte Springs is served by SunRail, the Central Florida Commuter Rail system. The station opened on May 1, 2014.

Notable people 

 Lauren Boebert, U.S. Representative for 
 Blake Bortles, NFL quarterback for the New Orleans Saints
 Nathaniel Jeremiah Bradlee, architect (vacationed in Altamonte Springs)
 Selwyn Carrol, member of the Alaska House of Representatives
 Alexa Demara, actress, model and writer
 Chris DiMarco, professional golfer
 Patrick DiMarco, NFL free agent fullback
 Danielle Fotopoulos, soccer coach and former player
 Nick Franklin, MLB free agent
 John Gast, former MLB pitcher
 Ashleigh Gnat, gymnast and member of the LSU Tigers women's gymnastics team
 Benjamin F. Haines, attorney and member of the Massachusetts House of Representatives
 Charles Delemere Haines, businessman and member of the U.S. House of Representatives
 Alcee Hastings, judge and member of the U.S. House of Representatives
Kam Lee, an early member of Death as well as a member of Massacre
 Mark Lewis, Arena Football League kicker
 Daniel Rosario, Puerto Rican footballer
Rick Rozz, an early member of Death and a founder of Massacre
 Chuck Schuldiner, musician and founding member of Death and Control Denied
 Courtney Schulhoff, convicted murderer
 Anfernee Simons, NBA player for the Portland Trail Blazers
 Jennifer Sullivan, member of the Florida House of Representatives
 Rickie Weeks Jr., retired MLB second baseman
 Ian Williams, former NFL player for the San Francisco 49ers

References

External links 

  
 Altamonte Springs Collection on the RICHES Mosaic Interface Map

Cities in Seminole County, Florida
Greater Orlando
Cities in Florida
1920 establishments in Florida
Populated places established in 1920